Jeom clan of Goesan was one of the Korean clans. Their Bon-gwan was in Goesan County, North Chungcheong Province. According to the research in 2000, the number of Jeom clan of Goesan was 107. Jeom clan of Goesan was a clan which was naturalized from Japan, but the detail of their founder is not clear.

See also 
 Korean clan names of foreign origin

References

External links 
 

Korean clan names of Japanese origin